Lancaster, Pennsylvania could refer to:
  the city of Lancaster, Pennsylvania
 Lancaster, Pennsylvania metropolitan area
 Lancaster County, Pennsylvania

See also
 Lancaster Township, Lancaster County, Pennsylvania
 Lancaster Township, Butler County, Pennsylvania